Idiognathodus is an extinct conodont genus in the family Idiognathodontidae.

Use in stratigraphy 
The species Idiognathodus simulator made its first appearance during the Gzhelian, the youngest age of the Pennsylvanian (late Carboniferous).

Two species (Idiognathodus toretzianus and Idiognathodus sagittatus) are amongst the three conodonts forming the biozones of the Kasimovian, the third stage in the Pennsylvanian.

One species (Idiognathodus sinuosus) is an index fossil of a biozone of the Bashkirian, the oldest age of the Pennsylvanian, amongst six biozones based on conodonts.

See also 
 List of Global Boundary Stratotype Sections and Points

References

External links 

 Idiognathodus at fossilworks.org (retrieved 14 May 2016)
 

Ozarkodinida genera
Pennsylvanian conodonts
Bashkirian life
Gzhelian life
Kasimovian life
Pennsylvanian first appearances
Pennsylvanian extinctions
Fossil taxa described in 1931